Myxidiidae is a family of myxozoans.

Genera
The World Register of Marine Species includes the following genera in the family:
 Enteromyxum  Palenzuela, Redondo & Alvarez-Pellitero, 2002
 Myxidium Buetschli, 1882
 Sigmomyxa Karlsbakk & Køie, 2012
 Zschokkella Auerbach, 1909

References

 
Cnidarian families
Variisporina